The Macchi M.16 was a light, single-seat aircraft designed by Alessandro Tonini and produced by Macchi in Italy in 1919.

Design and development
The M.16 was a single-bay biplane with unstaggered wings and a largely conventional design except for an unusually deep fuselage that extended in a bulge below the lower wing. The M.16  was developed in parallel with the Macchi M.20, a two-seat civil trainer aircraft which it resembled and with which it shared many common features.

The M.16 proved a successful sporting type, setting an altitude record of 3,770 m (12,370 ft) in 1920 while competing for the Coppa Mappelli ("Mapelli Cup"), and winning first prize in the competition in 1921.

The United States Navy purchased three float-equipped examples for evaluation as communication floatplanes.

Operators

Private users

United States Navy

Specifications

See also

Notes

References

 
 Уголок неба

1910s Italian sport aircraft
M.16
Biplanes
Single-engined tractor aircraft
Aircraft first flown in 1919